Melinda Pastrovics (born 28 May 1981, in Kiskunhalas) is a former Hungarian handball goalkeeper and current coach. A former Hungarian international, Pastrovics retired after a series of injuries in the second part of 2017. Currently she is the goalkeeping coach of Siófok KC.

She made her full international debut on 8 April 2006 against Norway. Her first major tournament was the European Championship in 2008 and she also participated on the World Championship one year later.

Achievements
Nemzeti Bajnokság I:
Winner: 2002, 2007
Silver Medalist: 2006, 2012
Bronze Medalist: 2004, 2005, 2008, 2009, 2011
Hungarian Cup:
Silver Medalist: 2007, 2009, 2010
EHF Champions League:
Finalist: 2002
EHF Cup:
Winner: 2006
Semifinalist: 2005
EHF Cup Winners' Cup:
Winner: 2011, 2012
Semifinalist: 2007
EHF Champions Trophy:
Third Placed: 2002
Fourth Placed: 2006
Junior World Championship:
Silver Medalist: 2001

References

External links
 Melinda Pastrovics player profile Ferencvárosi TC Official Website
 Melinda Pastrovics career statistics at Worldhandball

1981 births
Living people
Hungarian female handball players
People from Kiskunhalas
Fehérvár KC players
Siófok KC players
Sportspeople from Bács-Kiskun County